Conversations with Warne Volume 2 is an album by saxophonist Pete Christlieb's Quartet featuring Warne Marsh which was recorded in 1978 and released on the Dutch Criss Cross Jazz label in 1991.

Reception 

The Allmusic review states "tenors Pete Christlieb and Warne Marsh match wits, swing and ideas throughout nine runthroughs on "originals" based on common chord changes. ... Because Marsh and Christlieb had very different sounds but competitive natures, plenty of sparks flew during this date".

Track listing 
All compositions by Pete Christlieb and Jim Hughart
 "No Tag" – 7:50
 "Fishtale" – 5:34
 "So What's Old" – 6:25
 "You Drive!" – 8:14
 "Nate and Dave" – 6:12
 "Lunch" – 8:12
 "Woody and You" – 6:06
 "Bess, You Is My Man" – 6:53
 "The April Samba" – 5:15

Personnel 
Pete Christlieb, Warne Marsh – tenor saxophone
Jim Hughart – bass
Nick Ceroli – drums

References 

Pete Christlieb albums
Warne Marsh albums
1991 albums
Criss Cross Jazz albums